The 1981 Wightman Cup was the 53rd edition of the annual women's team tennis competition between the United States and Great Britain. It was held at the International Amphitheatre in Chicago, Illinois in the United States.

References

1981
1981 in tennis
1981 in sports in Illinois
1981 in women's tennis
1981 in American tennis
1981 in British sport
1981 Wightman Cup
1981 in Illinois